Wanaty may refer to the following places:
 Wanaty, Masovian Voivodeship
 Wanaty, Silesian Voivodeship